The 1998 Indian general election in Maharashtra was held in three phases on 16, 22 and 18 February 1998.

These were held for 48 seats with the state going to polls in the first three phases of the general elections. The major contender in the state were the National Democratic Alliance (NDA) and the Indian National Congress.

The Indian National Congress won landslide victory in 1998 Indian General election  in Maharashtra.

Results

Results by Alliance:

List of Elected MPs:

1998 Indian general election
Indian general elections in Maharashtra